James Sneddon Black (22 May 1899 – 13 April 1933) was a Scottish footballer who played as a right half for Aberdeen.

Black began his career with Cowdenbeath and moved to America to play for Providence Clamdiggers and Springfield Babes. Upon returning to Scotland to join Aberdeen, he was suspended by the American Soccer League after a dispute about the ownership of the  The suspension was eventually lifted, allowing him to play for Aberdeen.

Black was implicated in the so-called 'Great Mystery' of 1931 which saw five players leave the club amid rumours of match-fixing.

References

Association football wing halves
Aberdeen F.C. players
Cowdenbeath F.C. players
Scottish Football League players
Scottish Junior Football Association players
Scottish Football League representative players
1899 births
1933 deaths
Sportspeople from Midlothian
Providence Clamdiggers players
Springfield Babes players
Scottish footballers
American Soccer League (1921–1933) players
Scottish expatriate sportspeople in the United States
Scottish expatriate footballers
Expatriate soccer players in the United States